Vendula Dušková (born 4 June 1998) is a Czech Paralympic swimmer who competes in international elite events. She is a double World bronze medalist and a three time European medalist, she has also competed at the 2016 Summer Paralympics but did not medal in her events.

Dušková was born with a congenital birth defect and had a tumour in her spinal cord aged seven months which resulted in nerve damage to her legs. The tumour got removed when she was nine months old.

References

1998 births
Living people
Sportspeople from Karlovy Vary
Paralympic swimmers of the Czech Republic
Swimmers at the 2016 Summer Paralympics
Czech female breaststroke swimmers
Medalists at the World Para Swimming Championships
Medalists at the World Para Swimming European Championships
Czech female freestyle swimmers
S8-classified Paralympic swimmers